Stacy Harris  (July 26, 1918 – March 13, 1973) was an American actor with hundreds of film and television appearances. His name is sometimes found misspelled Stacey Harris.

Early years
Harris was an Army pilot whose leg was injured in a plane crash less than six months after he enlisted in 1937. That injury prevented him from re-enlisting when World War II began, but he served with the American Field Service as an ambulance driver and with the French Foreign Legion as a dispatch rider. Before becoming an actor, he held a variety of jobs, including newspaper reporter, boxer, sailor, and artist.

Theatre
Harris acted in five Broadway plays and received a New York Critics Award.

Radio
Harris was known for his role as agent Jim Taylor on ABC Radio's This is Your FBI. In 1946, Jerry Devine, that program's producer-director, told newspaper columnist Jack O'Brian: "Stacy has just the sort of voice I need for the quiet authority of the special agent on my show. On top of that, he's a good actor, and it's a combination on radio which can't be beat."

His other roles in radio programs included Batman in The Adventures of Superman, and Ted Blades in The Strange Romance of Evelyn Winters. He was also a member of the casts of Confession, Dragnet, Pepper Young's Family, Destiny's Trails, and Frontier Gentleman.

Television
A partial list of Harris's roles in television programs includes:

Harris played varied characters, often villains, on various programs produced by Jack Webb's Mark VII Limited, such as Dragnet, Noah's Ark, GE True, Adam-12, and Emergency!.

Harris guest starred in the religion anthology series Crossroads and played a gangster in the 1956 time travel television episode of the anthology series Conflict entitled "Man from 1997" opposite James Garner and Charles Ruggles. Thereafter, he appeared as Whit Lassiter in the 1958 episode "The Man Who Waited" of the NBC children's western series Buckskin. He guest starred as Colonel Nicholson in the 1959 episode "A Night at Trapper's Landing" of the NBC western series Riverboat starring Darren McGavin.

Harris also appeared in three syndicated series, Whirlybirds, starring Kenneth Tobey, Sheriff of Cochise and U.S. Marshal, both with John Bromfield, and as the character Ed Miller in the episode "Mystery of the Black Stallion" of the western serious Frontier Doctor starring Rex Allen. He was cast in two episodes of the David Janssen crime drama Richard Diamond, Private Detective.

Harris in 1958 portrayed Max Bowen in "The Hemp Tree" and in 1959 as Abel Crowder in "Rough Track to Payday", episodes of the CBS western series, The Texan, starring Rory Calhoun.

In 1960, Harris was cast as a drummer named Cramer in the episode "Fair Game" of the ABC western series The Rebel starring Nick Adams. Harris appeared in three episodes of CBS's Perry Mason, playing the role of murder victim Frank Curran in "The Case of the Married Moonlighter" (1958), Perry's client Frank Brooks in "The Case of the Lost Last Act" (1959), and murderer Frank Brigham in "The Case of the Crying Comedian" in 1961. In 1963 Harris appeared as a Gambler on the TV western The Virginian in the episode titled "If You Have Tears". In 1969, Harris played the corrupt and cowardly Mayor Ackerson in the episode "The Oldest Law" of Death Valley Days.

Death
Harris died March 13, 1973, at the age of 54 in Los Angeles, California, of an apparent heart attack.

Filmography

References

External links
 
 

1918 births
1973 deaths
20th-century American male actors
American male film actors
American male television actors
American male voice actors
Canadian emigrants to the United States
Male actors from Los Angeles
Male actors from Seattle